Jean-Guy Cardinal (March 10, 1925 – March 16, 1979) was Deputy Premier of Quebec, Canada.

Early life
He was born on March 10, 1925, in Montreal, Quebec.

Union Nationale

Cardinal was a supporter of the Union Nationale. He was appointed to the Legislative Council of Quebec and to Daniel Johnson Sr.'s Cabinet in 1967 when became Minister of Education; in 1968, he became Deputy Premier.

Less than a year later, Premier Johnson died.  Cardinal won a by-election and took over Johnson's seat to the National Assembly of Quebec.  However, he lost his bid to become his party's leader against Jean-Jacques Bertrand on June 21, 1969.

Cardinal won re-election to the legislature in 1970, but did not run for re-election in 1973.

Parti Québécois

In the subsequent years, Cardinal joined the Parti Québécois and was joined by many of his former colleagues from the Union Nationale such as Antonio Flamand, Raynald Fréchette and Jérôme Proulx.  In 1976, he was returned to the legislature as the MNA for the district of Prévost and became Deputy Speaker of the National Assembly.

Death

He died in office on March 16, 1979.

External links
 

1925 births
1979 deaths
Union Nationale (Quebec) MLCs
Parti Québécois MNAs
Politicians from Montreal
Union Nationale (Quebec) MNAs
Deputy premiers of Quebec
Vice Presidents of the National Assembly of Quebec